The Qingdao Tiantai Stadium, former name Qingdao First Stadium, is a multi-use stadium in Qingdao, Shandong, China. It is used mostly for football matches, but also for athletics and rugby sevens.

Tiantai Stadium was built in 1932 as Qingdao Municipal Stadium, modelling on Los Angeles Memorial Coliseum, which hosted the 1932 Summer Olympics. It renamed as Qingdao First Stadium in 1950s and as Tiantai Stadium in November 2003.

See also
 Sports in China

References

External links
Qingdao Tiantai Stadium picture

Buildings and structures in Qingdao
Football venues in Qingdao
Sport in Qingdao
Sports venues in Shandong
Tourist attractions in Qingdao
Qingdao Hainiu F.C. (1990)